Gryting was, according to the Heimskringla, a king of Orkdal in the period leading up to Harald Fairhair's unification of Norway. He was the first leader in Trøndelag to make a stand against King Harald's ravaging of the country. At the Battle of Orkdal Gryting's men were defeated and Gryting taken prisoner. After this Gryting swore allegiance to king Harald.

Norwegian petty kings
9th-century Norwegian monarchs